Aieshaleigh Smalley (born 23 September 1991) is a New Zealand rugby league footballer who played for the New Zealand Warriors in the NRL Women's Premiership.

Background
Born in Auckland, Smalley began playing rugby league as a teenager for the Manukau Rovers.

Playing career
In 2017, while playing for the Otahuhu Leopards, Smalley was selected in the New Zealand squad for the 2017 Women's Rugby League World Cup. 

On 1 August 2018, Smalley was announced as a member of the New Zealand Warriors NRL Women's Premiership team. 

In Round 1 of the 2018 NRL Women's season, she made her debut for the Warriors in a 10–4 win over the Sydney Roosters.

References

External links
NRL profile

1991 births
Living people
New Zealand sportspeople of Tongan descent
New Zealand people of Niuean descent
New Zealand female rugby league players
New Zealand women's national rugby league team players
New Zealand Warriors (NRLW) players